Massachusetts House of Representatives' 11th Bristol district in the United States is one of 160 legislative districts included in the lower house of the Massachusetts General Court. It covers part of Bristol County. Democrat Chris Hendricks of New Bedford has represented the district since 2019.

Locales represented
The district includes the following localities:
 Acushnet
 part of New Bedford

The current district geographic boundary overlaps with that of the Massachusetts Senate's 2nd Bristol & Plymouth district.

Former locales
The district previously covered:
 part of Fall River, circa 1927 
 Somerset, circa 1927

Representatives
 Robert L. Pitman, circa 1858 
 Thomas H. Soule, circa 1858 
 Samuel Watson, circa 1858–1859 
 Nathan B. Gifford, circa 1859 
 Augustus L. West, circa 1859 
 James T. Bagshaw, circa 1920 
 William Cyril Crossley, circa 1920 
 Ernest A. Larocque, circa 1920 
 Harold Clinton Nagle, circa 1951 
 James Anthony O'Brien, circa 1951 
 Carlton M. Viveiros, circa 1975 
 Roger R. Goyette, 1979-1987 
Christopher Hendrickss, 2019–current

See also
 List of Massachusetts House of Representatives elections
 Other Bristol County districts of the Massachusetts House of Representatives: 1st, 2nd, 3rd, 4th, 5th, 6th, 7th, 8th, 9th, 10th, 12th, 13th, 14th
 List of Massachusetts General Courts
 List of former districts of the Massachusetts House of Representatives

Images

References

External links
 Ballotpedia
  (State House district information based on U.S. Census Bureau's American Community Survey).

House
Government of Bristol County, Massachusetts